was a castle in Takayama, Gifu Prefecture, Japan (formerly Hida Province). It was built by, and ruled from, by Yasutane Shiina during the 16th century.

Outline
The castle was built on Mount Matsukura (松倉山 Matsukura-yama), which is in the southwestern area of the present-day Takayama. While only the stone foundation surrounding the castle remains today, and the site was designated an Important Cultural Asset by the prefecture in 1956.

References

 

Castles in Gifu Prefecture